Stayner may refer to:

People
Surname
Arthur Stayner (1835–1899), English-born American horticulturist 
Cary Stayner (b. 1961), American serial killer 
Sir Richard Stayner ( ? - ? ), English naval officer who served during the First Anglo-Dutch War (1652-1654)
Steven Stayner (1965-1989), American kidnapping victim
Given name
Stayner Richards (1885-1953), Mormon missionary in the United Kingdom and a general authority of The Church of Jesus Christ of Latter-Day Saints from 1951 to 1953

Places
Stayner, a village in the township of Clearview, Ontario, Canada

Ships
, a British frigate in commission in the Royal Navy from 1943 to 1945

Sports
Stayner Siskins, a Canadian junior ice hockey team based in Stayner, Ontario

Other
Stayner (Clearview Field) Aerodrome, an airport near Stayner, Ontario, Canada

See also
Stainer